Maurice Sweetman (d 1427)was a 14th-century Archdeacon of Armagh.

A relative (possibly a nephew) of Milo Sweetman,  Archbishop of Armagh, he was appointed Archdeacon  before 1380 and was also Rector of Kilkelly and a Prebendary of Ferns.

Notes

14th-century Irish Roman Catholic priests
15th-century Irish Roman Catholic priests
1427 deaths
Archdeacons of Armagh